"Stunnah" featuring Ebone Hoodrich is the lead single from Nicole Richie's mixtape entitled, Nikki Rich. The song was recorded in mid-2013 and released along with a music video on September 2, 2013, via YouTube for Richie's web series, #CandidlyNicole.

References

External links
Nicole Knows Hip Hop | Ep. 19 | #CandidlyNicole

2013 singles